Calandra may refer to:

People 
 Alexander Calandra (1911–2006), American physicist and educator
 Davide Calandra (1856–1915), Italian sculptor and cabinet maker
 Giovanni Battista Calandra (1586–), Italian mosaic artist
 Giuliana Calandra (1936–2018), Italian actor and television journalist
 John D. Calandra (1928–1986), American lawyer and politician
 Paul Calandra (born 1970), Canadian politician
 Peter Calandra, American composer and pianist
 Saúl Calandra (1904–1973), Argentine footballer
 Thom Calandra (born 1956), American journalist and investor
 Mauricio and Giuseppe Calandra, Italian musicians forming the duo Calandra & Calandra

Other uses 
 8967 Calandra, a main belt asteroid
 Calandra (beetle), a genus of weevils
 Calandra lark, a bird

See also
 Calandria (disambiguation)
 Calandro